Hatrick may refer to:

 Alexander Hatrick (1857 – 1918), a New Zealand merchant, shipowner, tourism entrepreneur and mayor
 Gloria Hatrick McLean, an American actress and model
 Hat-trick, the achievement of a positive feat three times in a game
 Hatrick Hodi Maga, (English: Hit a hat-trick son), a 2009 Indian Kannada action-crime film